Cotwall may refer to:

 Cotwall, Shropshire, a hamlet in the parish of Ercall Magna, in Shropshire, England
 Cotwall End, an area of Sedgley, in the West Midlands, England